

This is a list of the National Register of Historic Places listings in Columbia, South Carolina.

This is intended to be a complete list of the properties and districts on the National Register of Historic Places in Columbia, South Carolina, United States.  The locations of National Register properties and districts for which the latitude and longitude coordinates are included below, may be seen on a map.

There are 184 properties and districts listed on the National Register in Richland County, including 5 National Historic Landmarks. The city of Columbia is the location of 146 of these properties and districts, including all of the National Historic Landmarks; they are listed here, while the properties and districts in the remaining parts of the county are listed separately. Another 3 properties in Columbia were once listed but have been removed.

Current listings

|}

Former listings

|}

See also

List of National Historic Landmarks in South Carolina
National Register of Historic Places listings in South Carolina

References

 
Columbia
Columbia, South Carolina